Wilgus may refer to:

William J. Wilgus (1865–1949), an American civil engineer
D. K. Wilgus (1918–1989), an American folksong scholar
Wilgus, Pennsylvania, an unincorporated community
Wilgus Site, a prehistoric Native American camp site in Delaware
Wilgus State Park, a park in Ascutney, Vermont